Ghardaïa is located in the north of the Algerian desert, and the headquarters of the state is the city of Ghardaia 600 km south of the capital Algiers, its total area is estimated at 21224.03 Km², its extension from north to south is 138 km, and from east to west it rises from 200 to 250 km, above sea level With 486 m.

Geographical location
The province is bordered by the province of Djelfa and the province of Laghouat to the north, the province of El Menia in the south, the province of Ouargla to the east and the province of El Bayadh in the west.

The city of Ghardaia, the capital of the province, is 200 km Laghouat, 200 km from Ouargla, 270 km from El Menia and 430 km from El Bayadh, and is crossed by the national road N° 1 linking the Algerian capital to the Great South.

Climate
Since the state is located in desert areas, the climate of the region is arid desert, the temperature range is wide between day and night, and between winter and summer, the winter temperature ranges between 1 to 25 degrees, and between 18 to 48 degrees in summer. The weather is fair in spring and autumn, and the sky is clear most days of the year.

The average rainfall in the state is about 60 mm / year, mostly in the winter season. How much cold northwesterly winds blow in the winter and south-westerly winds laden with sand in the spring and in the summer a hot south known as Sirocco.

History

The region of Beni Mzab
"Aghlan" is the name the Beni Mzab have given to their region. Its geographical borders are as follows: Oued Bouzbyar in the North, Oued Zergoun in the west. The Mzab includes Zelfana and Guerrara in the east and is merged to the region of Chaamba in the south. The area is approximately 38000 km².

During the 8 century A.D, 2 century Hegira (according to Cheikh Abi Ishak Tfyeche) thé Beni Mzab settled on the banks of the oued or Valley to which they gave their name. The first inhabitants of the area had been nomadic or semi-nomadic. Many old small built-up areas, fallen into ruins long time ago, can be counted: in nearby al Atteuf we mention Agharm Netlazdit, Oukheira, and Aoulaoual, Tmazzert once existed near Bounoura and Agharm Enwadday has preceded the present city of Melika.
Not far from Tafilalt were the towns of Mourki. Tirichine, Tlet Moussa, Agnounay and Boukyaou.

The final settling process of Beni Mzab along with the emergency of the three following cities: El Atteuf, which was settled in 1012; Bounoura in 1065, Ghardaia settled in 1085; and more than tow centuries later, in 1321, Tafilalt expanded and integrated the inhabitants of its neighboring villages and is named since then Beni Isgeun. In 1355, Melika succeed Agharm Enwadday. This way the Mzab pentapolis was born.

three centuries later, in 1631, the town of Guerrara was founded 90 km Northeast of the pentapolis and 60 years later the town of Berriane was founded 40 km North of the pentapolis.

Now and since the last administrative division (in 1984) the seven Mzabite towns have been reduced into five municipalities in the province of Ghardaia.

Administrative divisions
The province is made up of 7 districts, which are divided into 9 communes or municipalities.

Districts
 Métlili
 Bounoura
 Ghardaïa
 Dhayet Bendhahoua
 Zelfana
 Bérianne
 Igraren

Communes
 At bergane 
 At bounour 
 Dhayet Bendhahoua 
 Tajnint
 Igrarene 
 Taghrdait
 Metlili
 Sebseb
 Zelfana

The governors
The position of Wali of Ghardaia was held by many national political figures since its establishment on 4 February 1984 under Law No. 84-09 which reorganized the Algerian territories by increasing the number of provinces from thirty-one to forty-eight.

Transportation

Road transport 
The state of Ghardaia is characterized by the presence of a road transport network, represented by a network of highways, in addition to a huge fleet of large and small buses, yellow taxis, and others.

Air transport 
Ghardaia Airport - Numirat Moufdi Zakaria (IATA: GHA, ICAO: DAUG) is an international airport located in the city of Ghardaia, and the airport was named after the Algerian poet Moufdi Zakaria.

Ghardaia state road network  
The state of Ghardaia is characterized by a wide road network that connects the regions of the state with each other, as well as the state of Ghardaia, with the neighboring states, as well as the highway (north-south).

National roads 

 National Road No. 01 (North-South highway).
 National Road No. 49.
 National Road No. 107.

State roads 

 State Road No. 33 The link between the municipality of Berriane and El Guerrara
 State Road No. 105 The link between the municipality of El Atteuf and the national road n ° 01
 State Road No. 105B Avoidance road to the municipality of El Atteuf
 State Road No. 106 The link between the municipality of Sebseb, via the municipality of Metlili, to the national road N° 01
 State Road No. 147 The link between the municipality of Dhayet Bendhahoua, passing through the municipality of Ghardaia and Bounoura, up to the national road No. 01
 State Road No. 201 The link between the municipality of Zelfana and  El Guerrara
 State Road No. 347 The link between the municipality of El Guerrara and Guettara

References

External links
  Official website

 
Provinces of Algeria
States and territories established in 1984